Angel Airlines was a private airline with its base at Băneasa Airport (the capital's second airport), Bucharest, Romania. It operated domestically, to main cities in Romania.

History
Angel Airlines was founded in August 2001, first flying from Bucharest to Baia Mare and Iași. It was founded as a result of Romania's rapid economic development, and the growing domestic and short-haul international airline market. The major goal of Angel Airlines was to connect other cities in Romania and the region with Bucharest, the country's business center, and a major economic center in the Eastern and Central Europe region.

The company declared bankruptcy and closed in 2004.

Services
Angel Airlines used to fly to the following destinations from Bucharest:

Arad
Baia Mare
Constanța
Iași
Oradea
Satu Mare
Sibiu
Suceava
Târgu Mureș

Some flights were under codeshare agreements with TAROM, the national carrier. According to Angel's business practise, Angel had two flights on each route, one in the morning and one in the evening, for maximum efficiency.

In August 2002, the airline adopted a new business strategy that was still focused on efficient timing and routes, but also on international and charter flights. The airline was in agreement with a number of Romanian tour operators to provide charter flights to destinations in Turkey, Albania, Bulgaria, Greece, and Italy. The airline also introduced the following international and domestic flights:

Constanța–Istanbul (two flights per week)
Bucharest–Tirana (two flights per week)

Angel Airlines was also planning to introduce flights on the route Bucharest–Tirana–Bari and Bucharest–Craiova–Rimini.

Fleet
The Angel Airlines fleet consisted of two BAe Jetstream 31 aircraft.

External links

Photos on airliners.net

References

Defunct airlines of Romania
Airlines established in 2001
Airlines disestablished in 2004
Romanian companies established in 2001